Safradine Traoré (born 31 May 1986 in Porto Novo) is a Beninese international football player who currently plays for Buffles FC.

Career 
Traoré began his career with Buffles FC and was promoted to the first team in 2005.

International 
He played his first three caps for Benin in 2005 and was member of the CAN Coupe du Monde 2006.

References

External links 
 

1986 births
Living people
Beninese footballers
Benin international footballers
Buffles du Borgou FC players
People from Porto-Novo

Association football forwards